The Community (stylized as the community and also known as La Comunidad) is a global advertising agency with offices in Miami, Buenos Aires, London, San Francisco and New York City. It was founded in March 2001, simultaneously in both the USA and Argentina by Jose and Joaquin Molla. Jose Molla was Creative Director for Nike International at Wieden+Kennedy, while Joaquin was the Creative Director of Ratto/BBDO in Argentina. The company was founded on the idea that every brand has its community with whom it connects through universal truths which transcend nations and ethnicities.

In January 2014, The Community was acquired by SapientNitro, which itself became Publicis Sapient in 2015. The following month, Joaquín and José Mollá published a satiric video called "Why we sold", explaining in their own words the reasons they decided to join SapientNitro, while enjoying different fancy and extravagant luxuries that they could now afford.

References

External links 
 The Community website

Advertising agencies of the United States
Economy of Miami
Companies based in Miami
Marketing companies established in 2001
Publicis Groupe